Adrián Ladrón is a Mexican actor best known for his performances in films as The 4th Company, Oveja Negra, Güeros, and After Dark. Ladrón is an actor graduated from the National School of Theater Arts of Instituto Nacional de Bellas Artes y Literatura. He won the Ariel Award for best actor in 2017.

Filmography

Film roles

Television roles

References

External links 
 

Living people
21st-century Mexican male actors
Mexican male film actors
Year of birth missing (living people)